Nolanea claviformis, or Entoloma claviforme, is a mushroom in the family Entolomataceae. Described as new to science in 2014, it is found in Guyana, where it fruits on humus under Dicymbe corymbosa. The specific epithet claviformis/claviforme (club-shaped) refers to the shape of its stipe.

Although it was originally described under the genus name Nolanea, this is nowadays generally regarded as a sub-genus of Entoloma, and so the current name is Entoloma claviforme.

References

External links

Entolomataceae
Fungi described in 2014
Fungi of Guyana